was a Japanese writer.

After first being employed by a publisher, Yamamoto, himself, became a full-time writer.

In 2004, he won the Seichō Matsumoto Award for Katen no shiro, and in 2009 the Naoki Prize for Rikyū ni Tazune yo. Both books were made into movies.

Yamamoto died on February 13, 2014, from lung cancer at the age of 57.

Awards 
 Seichō Matsumoto Award (2004)
 Naoki Prize (2009)

References 

20th-century Japanese novelists
21st-century Japanese novelists
Doshisha University alumni
Writers from Kyoto Prefecture
1956 births
2014 deaths